The men's javelin throw at the 1978 European Athletics Championships was held in Prague, then Czechoslovakia, at Stadion Evžena Rošického on 29 and 30 August 1978.

Medalists

Results

Final
30 August

†: Vasiliy Yershov ranked initially 5th (85.06m), but was disqualified for infringement of IAAF doping rules.

Qualification
29 August

†: Vasiliy Yershov initially reached the final, but was disqualified later for infringement of IAAF doping rules.

Participation
According to an unofficial count, 23 athletes from 12 countries participated in the event.

 (2)
 (2)
 (3)
 (3)
 (1)
 (2)
 (1)
 (1)
 (3)
 (2)
 (1)
 (2)

References

Javelin throw
Javelin throw at the European Athletics Championships